Anguina spermophaga is a plant pathogenic nematode, that attacks sugarcane (Saccharum officinarum).

References 

Agricultural pest nematodes
Sugarcane diseases
Tylenchida